Pelion Gap ( or ) is the mountain pass between Mount Doris and Mount Ossa to the south and Mount Pelion East to the north through which the Overland Track in Tasmania passes.

This is a popular resting place for walkers on the Overland Track as it is the highest point between Pelion Hut and Kia Ora Hut, is approximately halfway between the two and also has a large wooden platform surrounded by log seating.

Pelion Gap is also the starting point for two side-trip climbs; Mount Ossa and Mount Pelion East.

See also
Cradle Mountain-Lake St Clair National Park
Mount Ossa
Mount Pelion East

References

Mountain passes of Australia
Central Highlands (Tasmania)